Dunkirk is a census-designated place (CDP) in Calvert County, Maryland, United States. The population was 2,521 at the 2010 census.

Geography
Dunkirk is located in northwestern Calvert County at  (38.713499, −76.670070). Its western border is the Patuxent River, which is also the Prince George's County line. Maryland Route 4 passes through the center of Dunkirk, leading northwest  to Upper Marlboro and south  to Prince Frederick, the Calvert County seat.

Climate
The climate in this area is characterized by hot, humid summers and generally mild to cool winters.  According to the Köppen Climate Classification system, Dunkirk has a humid subtropical climate, abbreviated "Cfa" on climate maps.

Demographics

As of the census of 2000, there were 2,363 people, 757 households, and 681 families residing in the CDP. The racial makeup of the CDP was 91.62% White, 5.97% African American, 0.08% Native American, 1.02% Asian, 0.25% from other races, and 1.06% from two or more races. Hispanic or Latino of any race were 0.85% of the population.

There were 757 households, out of which 40.7% had children under the age of 18 living with them, 80.2% were married couples living together, 7.4% had a female householder with no husband present, and 10.0% were non-families. 7.9% of all households were made up of individuals, and 2.4% had someone living alone who was 65 years of age or older. The average household size was 3.12 and the average family size was 3.28.

In the CDP, the population was spread out, with 29.1% under the age of 18, 5.9% from 18 to 24, 25.8% from 25 to 44, 31.3% from 45 to 64, and 7.9% who were 65 years of age or older. The median age was 39 years. For every 100 females, there were 100.6 males. For every 100 females age 18 and over, there were 97.1 males.

The median income for a household in the CDP was $107,508, and the median income for a family was $102,240. Males had a median income of $157,900 versus $61,025 for females. The per capita income for the CDP was $31,923. None of the families and 0.2% of the population were living below the poverty line, including no under eighteens and none of those over 64.

References

Census-designated places in Calvert County, Maryland
Census-designated places in Maryland